Geoff Greetham (born 5 June 1962) is  a former Australian rules footballer who played with St Kilda in the Victorian Football League (VFL).

Notes

External links 
		

Living people
1962 births
Australian rules footballers from Victoria (Australia)
St Kilda Football Club players